Kannayya Kittayya is a 1993 Telugu-language fantasy comedy film written and directed by Relangi Narasimha Rao. It stars Rajendra Prasad, Shobana, Aamani  and music composed by famous Telugu film director Vamsy. The film was recorded as Above Average at the box office.

Plot
The film begins in a village where Kittayya (Rajendra Prasad) an advent devotee of Lord Krishna who calls him Kannayya out of adoration. Kittayya always bars the barbarities of his malicious maternal uncle Bangarayya (Kota Srinivasa Rao). His mother Janakamma (Annapurna) takes the oath to marry his uncle's daughter Saroja (Shobana) to hit his conceit. Saroja a vainglory woman, returns from abroad when Kittayya teases her.

To requite Bangarayya makes a play and publicly insults Kittayya and Janakamma when frustrated Kittayya rebukes on the Lord. Hearing it, Lord Krishna (again Rajendra Prasad) who resembles Kittayya appears to him. There onwards, Kannayya guides Kittayya and makes him acquire Saroja's love. Knowing it, Bangarayya conspires in many ways and Kannayya always protects him. Thereupon, Kittayya takes a vow from Kannayya to stay along with him in his attire until his marriage for teaching a lesson to Bangarayya which he agrees.

Meanwhile, in Vaikuntha, sage Narada (Brahmanandam) spoils the mindset of Rukmini (Aamani) and Satyabhama (Tulasi) by falsifying that Lord Krishna carrying out a love affair on earth. So they land on earth, losing their divine powers, confuse Kittayya for Lord Krishna and claim themselves as his wives. Learning it, Bangarayya exaggerates the situation when angered Kittayya warns them to knock out being unfamiliar with reality.

Exploiting it, Bangarayya slaughters the women and indicts Kittayya. Here, Kannayya drives Kittayya with a game plan that if he could present the women before villagers Bangarayya should couple up Saroja with him. But unfortunately, Rukmini and Satyabhama forcibly take Kannayya back and arrest him. So, Kittayya at earth cracked down by Bangarayya. Ultimately, Kittayya brings back Kannayya with his devotional power, proves his innocence and makes Bangarayya admit his mistakes. Finally, the movie ends on a happy note with the marriage of Kittayya and Saroja.

Cast
Rajendra Prasad as Kannayya (Lord Krishna) & Kittayya (Dual role)
Shobana as Saroja
Aamani as Rukmini
Tulasi as Satyabhama
Kota Srinivasa Rao as Bangarayya
Brahmanandam as Narada
Babu Mohan as Galigadu
Rallapalli as Gopanna
Sakshi Ranga Rao as Priest
Annapoona as Janakamma
Annuja as Chilaka
Y. Vijaya as Bangarayya's wife

Soundtrack

Music composed by Vamsy. Music released on Supreme Music Company.

Other
 VCDs and DVDs on - SHALIMAR Video Company, Hyderabad

References

External links

1990s fantasy comedy films
1990s Telugu-language films
Indian fantasy comedy films
1993 comedy films
1993 films
Films directed by Relangi Narasimha Rao